SNTR may refer to:

 Sixpence None the Richer, an American Christian rock/pop band
 St. Nersess Theological Review, an annual Armenological publication established by St. Nersess Armenian Seminary